The 1848 United States presidential election in Massachusetts took place on November 7, 1848, as part of the 1848 United States presidential election. Voters chose 12 representatives, or electors to the Electoral College, who voted for President and Vice President.

Massachusetts voted for the Whig candidate, Zachary Taylor, over Democratic candidate Lewis Cass and Free Soil candidate former president Martin Van Buren. Taylor won the state by a margin of 19.4%.

With 28.45% of the popular vote, Massachusetts would prove to by Van Buren's second strongest state in the country after neighboring Vermont.

Because no candidate received 50% of the vote, the choice of electors formally reverted to the state legislature, in accordance with the provisions of Massachusetts state law of the time. Ultimately this did not change the outcome since the Whigs controlled the legislature, which duly confirmed the choice of electors pledged to the clear plurality winner. Even if the Massachusetts legislature had chosen someone else, Taylor would have still had enough electoral votes (151, five more than a bare majority) to win the presidency.

Results

See also
 United States presidential elections in Massachusetts

References

Massachusetts
1848
1848 Massachusetts elections